Talli Tandrulu is a 1991 Telugu-language drama film, produced by A. V. Subba Rao and directed by T. Rama Rao. It stars Nandamuri Balakrishna and Vijayashanti, with music composed by Chakravarthy. The film was recorded as a Hit at the box office.

Plot
The film begins with a joint family its paterfamilias Veeramachineni Venkataramaiah an honorable-run timber business. He lives blissfully with his ideal wife Padmavati 3 sons and 2 daughters. Anand the younger one spends his life frolicking and worry-free. Once, he conflicts with a beautiful Kavitha which ignites wrangles between them. Besides, Sivaram a noxious who labored for Venkataramaiah prior grows up as his analogous by malpractice. He goes spare against Venkataramaiah and at all times keeps pace with him. At one point, Anand nabs Sivaram while tort and penal him. Thus, vengeful Chanti heinous son of Sivaram ploys by utilizing the clash of Anand & Kavitha and litigating them in an act of prostitution. 

Henceforth, to expunge the sullied on her Anand decides to marry Kavitha which is denied by his family members. As a result, Anand quits the house and hitches Kavitha. Following this, Sivaram proceeds towards Venkataramaiah for the nuptial of Chanti with his younger daughter Madhavi. Venkataramaiah spurns it and reviles Sivaram. In turn, as vengeance Sivaram immerses Venkataramaiah into deep debts for which his depot comes to auction. During that plight, his remaining children disavow and he collapses from a heart attack. Here, Anand steps in and words his mother to protect their depot. With the help of Kavitha, he temporarily postpones it. 

By that time, it’s too late because Padmavati is up in arms by committing suicide to stop the auction. Time being, Anand strives, earns well, clears all debts, and reestablishes his father’s prestige. Moreover, he arranges a fine match for Madhavi and Kavitha is carrying. Tracking it, his siblings Prakash, Ashok, & Kamala green-eye and file the case for their share. Sivaram exploits it and plots to squat the depot which is smashed by Anand. Therefore, he abducts Venkataramaiah & Kavitha, torment them, and also betrays Prakash & Ashok when they reform. At last, Anand ceases the baddies, but Venkataramaiah passes away. Before dying, he sells his eyes & Kidneys to support Anand for Madhavi’s wedding. In tandem, Anand is blessed with a baby boy. Finally, the movie ends on a happy note with the reunion of the family.

Cast

 Nandamuri Balakrishna as Anand
 Vijayashanti as Kavitha
 Satyanarayana as Sivaram 
 Gummadi as Venkataramaiah 
 Jaggayya as Dr. Ranga Rao
 Paruchuri Venteswara Rao as Jagapathi & Gajapathi (Dual role)
 Sakshi Ranga Rao as Deeshithulu
 Narra Venkateswara Rao as Pulla Rao
 Vijayan as Chanti Babu 
 Vidya Sagar as Prakash Rao
 Vinod as Ashok
 Raj Varma as Police Inspector
 Raja as Anand's friend
 Ali as Hotel Boy
 Bhimiswara Rao as Income Tax Officer
 Jayanthi as Padmavathi
 Sudha as Vimala
 Tatineni Rajeswari as Kavitha's mother
 Sri Lakshmi as Kamala
 Kalpana Rai as Principal
 Y. Vijaya as Jamuna Bai
 Master Tarun as Babji  
 Baby Sujitha as Rani

Soundtrack

Music composed by Chakravarthy. Music released on Cauvery Audio Company.

References

External links
 

1991 films
Films directed by T. Rama Rao
Films scored by K. Chakravarthy
1990s Telugu-language films